Jamaat al-Dawah ila al-Quran wal-Sunnah (Society for Dawah to the Quran and Sunnah), abbreviated as JDQS, also known as The Salafi Group, is a militant Islamist organisation operating in eastern Afghanistan.

Background
Founded around 1986 during the Soviet–Afghan War by Jamil al-Rahman as a splinter from the larger Hezbi Islami faction, Jamaat al Dawa al Quran was a Salafi organisation that hosted many Arab volunteers and received funding from sympathetic Saudi and Kuwaiti businessmen. The group was able to establish the Islamic Emirate of Kunar, an Islamist mini-state in Kunar Province in 1991, but it quickly dissolved after attacks by Hezbi Islami and al-Rahman's assassination in 1991, however JDQ continued to operate.

Following the 2001 US-led invasion of Afghanistan, one faction of JDQ registered as a political party and took part in the 2005 Afghan parliamentary elections. Alleged arbitrary arrests and cultural insensitivity by coalition forces, along with loss of influence in the local Kunar administration, led to JDQ members joining the local insurgency as the Salafi Taliban.

By the later part of the decade, JDQ began taking part in the insurgency against NATO and Afghan security forces in Korangal Valley. In 2010, the group pledged allegiance to Mullah Omar, leader of the Taliban. Taliban spokesman Zabiullah Mujahid released a statement announcing that JDQ was now a part of the Taliban.

JDQ was involved in the September 2010 kidnapping of British aid worker Linda Norgrove, who was accidentally killed by US forces during a rescue attempt.

Designation as a terrorist organization
Countries and organizations below have officially listed the group as a terrorist organization.

Combatant Status Review Tribunal
Having an affiliation with the organisation was raised by the Combatant Status Review Tribunal during the hearings of several detainees at Guantanamo Bay detention camp.

Training Camp
Counter-terrorism analysts, and the United Nations, assert that the Jamaat al Dawa al Quran maintained JDQ training camps, or built its bases on former Lashkar-e-Taiba training camps.
According to American counter-terrorism analysts, some Guantanamo captives' continued detention was justified by staying at, or other association with, a JDQ training camp.

Allegations used to justify the continued detention of Amir Yakoub Mohammed Al Amir Mahmoud stated he attended, and lived near, a JDQ training camp.
The training camp he was alleged to have attended was outside of Assad-Abad, where he trained on "AK-47s, M16s, RPGs, 82-mm mortar and an old piece of Soviet artillery."  He was alleged to have lived at the camp for a year, following the Soviets' defeat during the Soviet occupation of Afghanistan, where he "worked with Abu Ekhlas Al-Masri."

References

External links
 The First Islamic State: A Look Back at the Islamic Emirate of Kunar  – The Combating Terrorism Center at West Point, February 2016

Anti-Soviet factions in the Soviet–Afghan War
Groups affiliated with the Taliban
Jihadist groups in Afghanistan
Terrorism in Afghanistan
Organizations designated as terrorist by the United States
Salafi groups